Anthony Goldstone (25 July 1944 – 2 January 2017) was an English pianist, known for his eclectic repertoire. He also played a prominent part in promoting works for piano duo with his wife Caroline Clemmow.

Early life 
Goldstone was born on 25 July 1944 in Liverpool. He grew up in Sale and attended Brooklands Primary School there, then Manchester Grammar School. Eschewing a scholarship to Cambridge, he entered the Royal Northern College of Music (RNCM), then known as the Royal Manchester College of Music (RMCM). There he studied with Derrick Wyndham, and later in London with Maria Curcio.

Solo career 

After his 1965 debut with the Royal Manchester College of Music orchestra under John Barbirolli, he went on to success in international piano competitions, and his London debut at the Wigmore Hall in 1969.

Among many concerto appearances, his most notable may have been at the Last Night of the Proms in 1976, in which he played Benjamin Britten's Diversions for piano left hand and orchestra. Afterwards the composer wrote to him, “Thank you most sincerely for that brilliant performance of my Diversions. I wish I could have been at the Royal Albert Hall to join in the cheers.”

He was an enthusiastic proponent of the completion of works left unfinished by their composers, most spectacularly recording a four-movement "complete performing edition" of Schubert's Unfinished Symphony for piano duet, with Caroline Clemmow.

Goldstone and Clemmow piano duo 

In 1984, Goldstone began a piano duo partnership with Caroline Clemmow, whom he later married, in 1989.

They owned a pair of Grotrian-Steinweg grands, which they kept in the local church of St John the Baptist in Alkborough, North Lincolnshire, which was also the venue for many of their recordings. Their recordings were widely praised with Gramophone magazine saying "excellent sound and balance, too, the results always firmly focused and truthful in timbre...", Music Web International finding that "the recording quality is excellent"  and "the piano sound is very good; rich and full with plenty of detail"  and The Classical Reviewer noting that "the church acoustic allows the music to expand magnificently"  
Only Stephen Pritchard in a review in the Guardian said of one such recording that the acoustics were "sepulchral", and "pour[ed] some pretty cold water over some very hot music".

Personal life 

He was active in performing and recording until the end of his life. Founder of the  Divine Art label Stephen Sutton was quoted as saying: "Until the very last week, he was writing to me about his projects, retaining an amazing level of wit and even frivolity in what must have been extremely difficult circumstances..."

References

External links
Anthony Goldstone – Naxos Classical Music
Anthony Goldstone and Caroline Clemmow performing the well-known Berceuse from Fauré's Dolly Suite
Obituary in Limelight by Divine Art Recordings

1944 births
2017 deaths
Alumni of the Royal Northern College of Music
English classical pianists
Male classical pianists
Pupils of Maria Curcio
20th-century classical pianists
20th-century English musicians
21st-century classical pianists
21st-century English musicians
Classical piano duos
20th-century British male musicians
21st-century British male musicians
Albany Records artists